The Guild of European Research-Intensive Universities (also called The Guild) is a university network founded in 2016. It currently comprises twenty one of Europe's most distinguished research-intensive universities in sixteen countries, and is dedicated to enhancing the voice of academic institutions, their researchers and their students.

One of the objectives of the Guild is to promote common positions on higher education and research, especially towards prestigious institutions. For example, in early 2018, the Guild produced a few reference and positioning documents on the FP9, the next Framework Programmes for Research and Technological Development.

Its current president is Vincent Blondel, rector of the University of Louvain (UCLouvain), in Belgium.

Members 
In 2021, the group is made up of the following universities:

 Austria: University of Vienna
 Belgium: Ghent University, University of Louvain
 Denmark: Aarhus University
 Estonia: University of Tartu
 France: University of Paris Cité
 Germany: University of Tübingen, University of Göttingen
 Italy: University of Bologna
 Norway: University of Oslo
 Netherlands: University of Groningen, Radboud University Nijmegen
 Poland: Jagiellonian University
 Romania: Babeș-Bolyai University
 Slovenia: University of Ljubljana
 Spain: Pompeu Fabra University
 Sweden: Uppsala University
 Switzerland: University of Bern
 United Kingdom: University of Glasgow, King's College London, University of Warwick

References

External links 
 Official website

Organizations established in 2016
College and university associations and consortia in Europe